Radio Sinaloa  is the radio station of the government of the Mexican state of Sinaloa. It broadcasts on transmitters in Culiacán, Los Mochis and Mazatlán and carries a public radio format.

History

Radio Sinaloa went into operation on October 6, 2006.

Transmitters

References

Public radio in Mexico
Radio stations in Sinaloa